Brahma Ratham is a 1947 Telugu drama film directed by Chitrapu Narayana Rao. It is based on the novel of the same name written by Balijepalli Lakshmikantam.

Cast
 K. Raghuramaiah
 Addanki Srirama Murthy
 C. Krishnaveni
 B. Jayamma
 Parupalli Subba Rao
 A. V. Subba Rao
 Kumpatla
 Koteswara Rao
 Nagamani
 Rama Rao
 Saroja
 T. Kanakam
 Sriranjani
 Anasuya

Crew
 Director: Chitrapu Narayana Murthy
 Writer : Balijepalli Lakshmikantham
 Producer : Mirjapuram Maharaja
 Production company : Venkatarama Productions
 Choreographer : Vempati Satyam
 Art direction : T. V. S. Sharma
 Music director : Moti Babu

External links
 Brahma Ratham film at IMDb.
 Review of Brahma Ratham film in Roopavani Magazine.

1947 films
1940s Telugu-language films
Indian black-and-white films
Films directed by Chitrapu Narayana Rao
Indian drama films
1947 drama films
Films scored by Moti Babu